Claire is a 2001 film directed by Milford Thomas.

The story itself is loosely based on Kaguyahime, on an old Japanese fairy tale about an elderly childless couple that finds a child from the moon in a stalk of bamboo and raises her as their own. Thomas’ version tells a tale of an elderly male couple on a farm in the rural 1920s South who find the moon princess in an ear of corn. Thomas took the prize for Best First Feature (Special Mention) with this little number at the San Francisco International Lesbian & Gay Film Festival in 2002. Claire is an homage to early cinema. Accompanied by its silent-era camera, all set-design and special effects were achieved the old-fashioned way. Canvas backgrounds are present, alongside semi-hidden wires, multiple exposures and was filmed with a hand-cranked 35mm camera.

Plot
When the curtains open, viewers find themselves caught within a nightmare that strongly contrasts the dreaminess of sequences to come: a young girl's birthday party is cruelly interrupted by Josh's (Mish P. DeLight) loss of custody over her.  He wakes in a fright and squeezes the hand of his husband (James Ferguson) for comfort. Early on, a theme in Claire is identified here: the transcendence of love beyond social norms.  The audience is briefly walked through the pair's daily routine.  One exception emerges after the couple has lain down the following night: the appearance of Claire; their unexpected miracles, just a tiny thing inside an iridescent ear of corn.  As the story progresses and Claire grows into the shape of a young woman, she enchants onlookers with her beauty and readings of fantastic poetry in various languages.  Richard (Allen Jeffrey Rein) is particularly entranced; and gives her his copy of Shelley's work as a token.  It is in him that Claire discovers her miraculous healing powers proceeding his dive from a cliff in an attempt to win her affection.  While exemplifying the nontraditional family---two men lovingly raising a child of the moon---the film celebrates the diversity of family and also addresses the grief of losing a loved one.

Cast
Toniet Gallego as Claire, on whom this story revolves
Mish P. DeLight as Josh, one of the men that find Claire in a cornstalk whom adopts her as his own
James Ferguson as Walt, husband to Josh; Claire's second father
Allen Jeffrey Rein as Richard, Claire's (almost) romantic interest
Pat Bell as the antagonist of the story
Anna May Hirsch as Miss Earwood
Katherine Moore as Kat

Soundtrack
The film is accompanied solely by Orchestra De Lune conducted by Anne Richardson.  It was performed live when the film was originally shown at the San Francisco International Lesbian & Gay Film Festival.

External links
Official site
 
 

2001 films
American avant-garde and experimental films
American LGBT-related films
American black-and-white films
Films based on fairy tales
American independent films
Gay-related films
2000s avant-garde and experimental films
2001 directorial debut films
2000s American films